Udea tetragramma is a moth in the family Crambidae. It was described by John Frederick Gates Clarke in 1965. It is found on the Galápagos Islands.

The wingspan is 17–18 mm. The forewings are fuscous, strongly overlaid with ferruginous. There is a straight, transverse, ill-defined, fuscous line at two-fifths of the costa, extending to the dorsum at the basal third. From the apical sixth of the costa extends a transverse, ill-defined line to vein 2, then along vein 2 to the cell, then diagonally, outwardly and then straight to the dorsum at the outer two-thirds. There are three small white dots in the cell, preceded and followed by blackish-fuscous scales. There are also four ochreous-tawny spots on the outer half of the costa, alternating with suffused shades of blackish fuscous. On the termen, there are seven small, ill-defined blackish-fuscous dots. The hindwings are grayish fuscous. On the discocellulars and the bases of veins 6 and 8 there is a black spot preceded by a whitish area of the wing. From the apical fourth of the costa there is an irregular blackish-fuscous line, extending to the anal veins.

References

tetragramma
Moths described in 1965